A chili grenade is a type of non-lethal weapon developed by Indian military scientists at the Defence Research and Development Organisation for use by the Indian Armed Forces. The weapon is similar to tear gas. In 2016, civilian variants were being used for crowd control in Jammu and Kashmir.

The grenades use one of the world's spiciest chili pepper, bhut jolokia, species in weaponised form. The weapon emits a powerful skin and eye irritant as well as pungent smell that causes enemies to leave their cover or become physically incapacitated by the grenade's load. The pepper being used is the thumb-sized bhut jolokia (or ghost chili) which had previously been recognised by Guinness World Records as the hottest pepper in the world, but was later superseded by two other pepper cultivars, the Carolina Reaper and the Trinidad moruga scorpion. One bhut jolokia is more than 1,000,000 Scoville units.

See also 

 Riot control
 Pepper spray
 Hottest chili pepper

References

Non-lethal weapons
Grenades